Frank H. Hughes (January 14, 1881 – June 28, 1942) was an American sport shooter who competed in the 1924 Summer Olympics.

In 1924, he won the gold medal as member of the American team in the team clay pigeons competition and the bronze medal in the individual trap. He was born in Neligh, Nebraska and died in Rochester, Minnesota.

References

External links
profile

1881 births
1942 deaths
People from Neligh, Nebraska
American male sport shooters
Shooters at the 1924 Summer Olympics
Olympic gold medalists for the United States in shooting
Olympic bronze medalists for the United States in shooting
Trap and double trap shooters
Medalists at the 1924 Summer Olympics
19th-century American people
20th-century American people